4 Forests is another experimental album by Brian Dougans under the alias Part-Sub-Merged from 2007 which was released on The Future Sound of London's digital download website. It is the soundtrack to a short film made by the duo called "Part-Sub-Merged" to be released on FSOLdigital.com at some point in the near future. The music is darker than his "Polemical " work with analogue techno beats and synth ambience.

Track listing
 Second Glance (3:34)
 Slight Movement (3:17)
 Roadhedge (3:26)
 Wooden Gage (5:02)
 Opposite Side (5:02)
 Naked (1:26)
 Mind Altered (2:35)
 In The Forest (1:03)
 Held (4:42)
 Hallae (1:20)
 First Breath (2:42)
 Cark (3:01)

Crew
Composed, produced by Brian Dougans

References

External links
 

The Future Sound of London albums
2007 albums